David Goffin was the defending champion, but decided not to participate this year.

Tristan Lamasine won the title, defeating André Ghem in the final, 6–3, 6–2.

Seeds

Draw

Finals

Top half

Bottom half

References
Main Draw
Qualifying Draw

Tampere Open - Singles
2015 Singles